New Light Through Old Windows is the first compilation album by British singer-songwriter Chris Rea, released in 1988. The album consists primarily of re-recordings of songs from Rea's earlier albums, as well as the new track "Working on It", which peaked at No. 73 on the US Billboard Hot 100, and was Rea's only No. 1 on the Mainstream Rock Tracks chart. "On the Beach" peaked at No. 9 on the US Adult Contemporary singles chart, and No. 12 on the UK Singles Chart. The album reached number five on the UK Albums Chart, charted for over a year, and was certified 3× Platinum by BPI until 1992. It charted in the Top 10 in New Zealand, Australia and West Germany.

Track listing
All tracks written by Chris Rea.
 "Let's Dance" – 4:14
 "Working on It" (previously unreleased) – 4:24
 "Ace of Hearts" – 4:52
 "Josephine" – 4:33
 "Candles" – 4:44
 "On the Beach" – 6:51
 "Fool (If You Think It's Over)" – 4:03
 "I Can Hear Your Heartbeat" – 3:23
 "Shamrock Diaries" – 4:12
 "Stainsby Girls" – 4:06
 "Windy Town" – 4:05
 "Driving Home for Christmas" – 3:58
 "Steel River" – 6:48

The US vinyl release featured different cover artwork and an altered track listing, shown below:

 "Let's Dance" – 4:16
 "Working on It" – 4:25
 "I Can Hear Your Heartbeat" – 3:24
 "Windy Town" – 4:06
 "On the Beach" – 6:53
 "Steel River" – 6:48
 "Stainsby Girls" – 4:08
 "Ace of Hearts" – 4:52
 "Josephine" – 4:17 (different version than international release)
 "Candles" – 4:42

Personnel
Chris Rea – vocals, guitar, producer
Steve Gregory – Soprano saxophone
Robert Ahwai – guitar
Eoghan O'Neill – bass
Max Middleton – keyboards
Martin Ditcham – drums

Charts

Certifications

References

Chris Rea compilation albums
1988 compilation albums
Magnet Records compilation albums
Geffen Records compilation albums